William Brownell may refer to:

William P. Brownell (1839–1915), American soldier and Medal of Honor recipient
William Crary Brownell (1851–1928), American literary and art critic
William A. Whittlesey Brownell (died 1932), American architect, designer of Acacia Lodge
William A. Brownell (1895–1977), American educational psychologist
William E. Brownell, American scientist who conducts research at Baylor College of Medicine
William Brownell (politician) (1862–1916), Australian member of the Tasmanian House of Assembly